Miley Jab Hum Tum (When you and I met) is an Indian teen drama television series that aired on STAR One from 22 September 2008 to 19 November 2010. The show is about falling in love during college and developing relations for a lifetime. The show stars Mohit Sehgal, Sanaya Irani, Rati Pandey and Arjun Bijlani. The series is available digitally on Disney+ Hotstar.

Plot
The story begins at Excel College with the introduction of the basketball champion and college stud, Samrat Shergill (Mohit Sehgal) and the college diva Dia (Navina Bole) and their buddies Benji and Uday. Also studying at Excel are sisters Nupur Bhushan (Rati Pandey) and Gunjan Bhushan (Sanaya Irani) who left rural Morena for Mumbai. While Nupur loves fashion and is carefree and believes that one day she would find the man of her dreams, Gunjan is an introvert and though being the younger one, is more responsible and spends most of her time studying. They are cousins of the "Queen Bee" Dia and "Dodo" Uday. Dia is horrified by the news of their arrival at Excel and does everything in her power to make their lives miserable but in vain. Lead athlete and college star Samrat and his close friend Benji (Abhishek Sharma) are Dia's friends. At the same time, Mayank Sharma (Arjun Bijlani) is introduced as the geeky Greek god of Excel, a close rival and later a close friend of Samrat.

While Gunjan is reluctant to make friends so early, Nupur tries different outfits to look modern but ends up as a fashion disaster. Both sisters are ragged by Dia and the gang. While Mayank rescues Nupur from being locked in the men's washroom, Samrat disguises himself as a shy, studious guy to make fun of Gunjan and later saves her from drowning in a pool. Nupur receives Mayank as a project partner, dance partner, and traveling partner, while Gunjan gets pushed into a talent parade by Samrat and returns the support by tutoring him. Some misunderstandings build between Nupur and Mayank, and he refuses to represent the college with her in a competition. Dia dislikes the closeness of Gunjan with her crush and tries to bring down Gunjan in several ways, but fails. Nupur and Mayank end up fighting most of the time, but eventually, Mayank falls for Nupur when they go for the intercollegiate meet. He even saves her from goons which lead to injury in his shoulder. Gunjan becomes friends with Samrat when she realizes that he was helping her build her confidence throughout the RJ hunt, wanting nothing in return. Samrat and Dia begin losing the spark in their friendship as he starts spending most of the time with Gunjan. Meanwhile, Uday starts liking CJ. After the Holi party, Mayank drinks bhang and, under its effect, apologizes to Nupur for the misunderstanding that happened earlier. At the same time, Samrat drops Gunjan home and meets Dia outside her house, thus trying to balance both friendships. As time passes, Gunjan misinterprets subtleties from Samrat and begins to harbour an unstated love for him, just as he clarifies Gunjan to be his closest friend, unaware of his own feelings for her while being oblivious to her one-sided love. Mayank, disregarding his love, feuds with Nupur, though later they too become best friends.

Sheena (Preeti Keswani), a talented and attractive actress, enters Excel along with Ranvijay (Khushank Arora), a daredevil, rich and spoilt playboy. Sheena and Samrat strike up a relationship. Ranvijay almost hits Gunjan and Samrat with his bike, troubles Benji while he was with Samrat and flirts with Dia, which angers Samrat. Samrat dislikes Ranjivay and warns him to stay away from his friends. Seeing Samrat and her friendship weakening day by day, initially reluctant, Dia accepts Ranjivay's friendship as she feels that this would make Samrat jealous. Gunjan tells Samrat that Sheena will not allow their unique friendship to continue and asks him to stay away from Ranvijay. Samrat reluctantly agrees. Ranvijay gives Dia a lift to college on his bike while Samrat offers a lift to Sheena. They both have a bike race till college in which Samrat wins. He later rebukes Candy (the name given to Dia by Samrat) for taking a lift from Ranvijay despite having her own car. She replies by saying that he's not the only cool guy in college, and others can be happening too, indicating Ranvijay. One day, Samrat and Mayank fight with Ranjivay and his goons, in which Samrat gets hurt. Angered by the event, Dia slaps Ranjivay in front of the entire college and breaks their friendship. Ranvijay decides to take revenge on Samrat and Dia. He uses his charm to win back Dia's trust and makes her fall in love with him. After rejection from CJ, Uday falls for the newly appointed Dramatics teacher, Tamanna. The entire gang bags a role in the college play while Uday organises it. Mayank-Nupur, Samrat-Sheena, Dia-Ranvijay are paired together. Dia and Gunjan do not like Sheena's closeness with Samrat but don't say anything. During rehearsals, Mayank realises that his love for Nupur is inevitable and decides to make Nupur realize that she also loves him. During the college play, Mayank dramatically confesses his love for Nupur on stage, and they begin a relationship secretly with others. Later, Dia plans a surprise birthday party for Uday and invites Ranjivay but doesn't invite Sheena. Samrat is upset with this and confronts Dia. Dia tells him that Sheena's wavelength doesn't match their group and that they talk to her only because of him. Dia also tells him that Ranvijay has proposed to her and that she's not said yes to him and wanted to ask her best friend first before taking any decision. Samrat explains that there should be a strong friendship between two people before getting into a relationship. Dia questions the reference of friendship made by him; should it be like Samrat and hers or Samrat and Gunjan's. This leaves Samrat baffled. Dia changes the topic by saying that he takes a lot of time in friendship but not in case of love mentioning that Samrat and Sheena's relationship is going at rocket fast speed and there was no time for them to be friends first. Samrat and Dia decide that they will try to be friends with Ranvijay and Sheena, respectively, for their best friend's sake and even agree to go on a double date. At a subsequent party, Sheena frames Gunjan for trying to drown her, but Samrat doesn't believe her and supports Gunjan and breaks up with her. After leaving the party, Ranvijay frames Samrat for a drunk driving accident. He also insults Dia by revealing that she spent a night at his house when she got drenched in the rain, thus fulfilling his revenge. The gang manages to prove his innocence in court, and both Sheena and Ranvijay leave. Dia has a change of heart. She now respects her siblings and friends more after seeing their support during her low phase. Mayank tries to cheer her up, saying that this incident has brought 3 positives things in her life- she got closer to her best friend Samrat; she got close to her family, and she also has a chance to make some new friends like him. While Dia is surprised to see the newly changed Mayank, Nupur is thrilled that Mayank cares for her and her entire family.

During the brief time spent in jail, Samrat realizes his intense love for Gunjan because of others' remarks since that day. When he mistakenly calls Dia by Gunjan's name (Chashmish, as he often calls her) while saving her from falling off the ladder, he realizes that Gunjan is all over his head. Later, Gunjan believes that he has heard her extensive confession. Through a series of unfortunate circumstances, neither of them communicates their feelings leading to an extension of their friendship and a misunderstanding. Both sisters are hurt from their relationship difficulties and decide to immediately take a leave from Excel for an upcoming family wedding in Morena.

After the sisters leave, the gang feels lonely, knowing Dia and Uday would leave soon as well for the function. Mayank, wanting to apologize to Nupur for hiding their relationship and scolding her, follows her to Morena and enters the Bhushan household posing as Nupur's childhood friend 'Bablu' who has come to consider marrying her. Samrat and Benji reach Morena as Dia and Uday's friends. Samrat finally expresses his love to Gunjan on the night of Dusshera. Mayank promises to commit to Nupur.

Mayank suddenly finds out that his mother lost her job and leaves immediately without telling anyone. Nupur assumes their relationship is over and is furious. Her parents, Shashi and Ratna, form a negative opinion about Mayank. Ratna faults Samrat as well for his disruption during a religious ritual and asks him to leave immediately. Touched by Samrat's apology, Shashi hands him the responsibility of his daughters. The gang leaves for Mumbai.

Back at Excel, with Samrat's plan, Nupur tries to convince Mayank but in vain. She faints while running to stop Mayank, Nupur and Mayank can sort out their differences, and Mayank confesses his love to her in front of the public. Samrat and Gunjan are delighted to hear this conversation via Benji while being locked in a room that was initially set up for Mayank and Nupur. Samrat and Gunjan go on their first date. Mayank's mother finds a new job in Bangalore. While Mayank is gone, Ratna and the Bhushan family decide to get Nupur married and send the match, Bablu, to college. This new character is Adhiraj (Nishant Singh Malkani), Nupur's childhood friend and expected suitor. Adhiraj mistakes another Nupur to be the Nupur he is looking for. The gang takes advantage of this, and Adhiraj and the new Nupur begin to like each other.

The new Nupur gains everyone's trust and befriends them. However, she feels a strong affinity for Samrat. Her extreme concern for him creates doubt in Gunjan's mind. The new Nupur insists Samrat teach her basketball - an excuse to stay close to him. Meanwhile, Gunjan finds her passport, and it is revealed to her that the new Nupur is actually Suhani Shergil. Mayank returns to surprise his friends and comes to learn of what the gang has been up to and convinces them to tell Adhiraj the truth about Nupur. On questioning, Suhaani tells Gunjan that she is Samrat's long lost sister and how Samrat lived alone from a young age and begrudged the entire family because of his parents' bitter divorce. In the custody battle, he was separated from his sister and has since believed that his mother chose his sister over him. Suhaani had been living in London with their mother before coming to Excel to reunite with Samrat. Gunjan agrees to help her reunite with Samrat. Samrat is irked by the habit of Suhani reminding him of his past. He often ends up losing his temper and shouts at her. While he's confused about his extreme behaviour towards Suhani, he gets concerned when he mistakenly hits Suhani with his basketball. But again ends up scolding her publicly when she asks him if his guilt of hitting someone the same way in his childhood. However, Gunjan always plays the peacemaker. Suhani cooks Samrat's favourite dessert about which nobody knew, and this makes him suspicious. Suhani tries a good luck charm on Samrat's hand, wishing him all the best for the upcoming match in which Adiraj and Samrat both were participating. Later, Mayank and Nupur learn about Suhani's identity. At a party, Samrat compliments Suhani when she was dancing, which makes her really happy. When Samrat hugs her while dancing, she is overwhelmed and couldn't control her tears and runs away for the party. Samrat goes behind her and gets severely injured while saving her from getting hit by a bike. Suhani panics and takes him to the hospital with the gang's help. Adiraj questions Suhani about her feelings for Samrat when he sees her in a miserable condition in the hospital. Samrat also confronts her about her concern and that she knows everything about his likes and dislikes. He rebukes her and suspects that she is hiding something. He refuses to take any rest unless Suhani answers all his questions. On further questioning by Adiraj and Samrat about Samrat and her relationship, she breaks down and kneels in front of Samrat. She reveals about them being siblings. While Samrat refuses to accept her, Adiraj feels cheated knowing the reality of her not being Nupur Bhushan. Samrat rushes to college and breaks open Suhani's locker to find evidence of her being his sister. He gets infuriated to know that Gunjan and his friends knew about Suhani's identity, and they, too, hid the truth from him. He refuses to talk to anybody, including Dia, who tries to sympathize with him. Adiraj also misunderstands Suhani's intentions. When Suhani tries to stop him and trips on the stairs, he turns around to find Samrat saving her from the fall. Samrat schools Adiraj for hurting Suhani. While Samrat and Suhani reconcile and he takes her home, Adiraj decides to part ways with her. Adhiraj discloses this deception to Shashi, who then forces Nupur into marrying Adhiraj. Gunjan and Samrat also reconcile when he hears her crying on the phone about Nupur and Adiraj getting married as Adhiraj consents to the marriage in his anger at Suhaani's betrayal. Mayank, however, cheers up and upset Nupur by attending all the wedding functions in disguise and promises her that he will not let the wedding happen.

On the wedding day, Adiraj is finally told that the gang played this prank because Nupur loves Mayank, and he must believe that Suhaani is truly in love with him. Adhiraj soon decides to call off the wedding. Still, before he can tell his father, he is accidentally knocked out by Uday, so Mayank reluctantly replaces Adhiraj at the wedding ceremony. Mayank and Nupur are wedded, but Shashi disowns her as he feels betrayed and humiliated because of their rash actions. With nowhere to go, the couple turns to the gang for help. The gang makes a temporary arrangement for them to stay in a beautifully decorated college classroom for the night. Dia finally calls Mayank as brother-in-law, which makes him realize that he is family now.

Soon, the couple shifts to Samrat's guest house. Gunjan and Nupur disagree with Gunjan understanding their father's anger and Nupur objecting to Gunjan and Samrat's supposed indecent proximity at their second date. The sisters soon restore their relationship when Nupur protects Gunjan from being eve-teased by thugs. On Valentines Day, Adhiraj proposes to Suhaani, upsetting Gunjan, who had expected a proposal from Samrat. Gunjan tells Samrat about the importance of marriage before leaving the party alone. The same armed thugs corner Gunjan and harass her when Adiraj comes and saves her by fighting with the goons. During the fight, Gunjan gets shot and is rushed to the hospital. Adiraj is sent to jail accused of trying to kill Gunjan by shooting her. After Samrat's heartfelt proposal, Gunjan recovers to find herself paralysed from the waist down. At the hospital, Shashi forgives Nupur and once home tells Gunjan that he approves of Samrat. Gunjan, however, remembers Samrat not being ready for the commitment of marriage before the accident and thinking of herself as a burden, assures her father that she is not in love with him.

The thugs try to throw acid on Nupur and Gunjan, who Mayank and Samrat save. Next, Nupur battles the culprits - a well-known corrupt politician and his brother by putting her life in danger and gets them arrested and becomes Excel's role model. Because of the accident, Gunjan is not confident about standing and walking on her feet. Despite Samrat's several attempts, she fails to even stand on her own. The gang finally decides to go for a vacation to make Gunjan walk again. The gang makes a story about a king's ghost at the resort who kills everybody in his path. The gang implies Samrat's impending death by the king's spirit for Gunjan when Samrat truly gets unconscious and falls in danger's path. However, Gunjan cannot move and asks for help, and the gang runs to help Samrat see a road roller coming towards him. But eventually, Gunjan bolts up and runs to save his life, thus recovering fully. They celebrate Gunjan's recovery by dancing. While Samrat dances with Dia, Benji gets jealous and asks Samrat to allow him to dance with Dia. Benji starts developing feelings for Dia.

The gang returns home with their relationships strengthened. Still, their happiness is short-lived when a baby girl, as a prank, enters the life of Samrat, Mayank, Benji, Adhiraj, and Uday with a letter falsely claiming that one of them is the father. Boys and Girls hire detectives to find out about the baby's birth father and mother, suspecting that it is someone from the group. Doubts rise on Samrat and Mayank when Riya- Principal's daughter, visits Excel college who is doubted to be the baby's mother. Samrat and Mayank indulge in an argument when Samrat finds out that in the first year, Mayank kissed Riya while she was still Samrat's girlfriend. Later, Riya rebukes all rumours and leaves. The girls band together against the boys to participate in several tasks to prove themselves more responsible. Mayank saves Gunjan from a serious accident in one of these tasks, which makes Nupur guilty as she was only thinking of winning and did not stop to help her sister, whereas Mayank didn't mind losing to save his family. After a series of mishaps, it is finally revealed that the entire gang was on a reality show. Suhaani breaks the news that she has to return to London. Adhiraj decides to go with her and get married.

A famous director, Neil Oberoi, comes to Excel for an open casting call. He is an old friend of the Bhushan sisters and has a soft spot for Gunjan. After purposefully casting Gunjan, Neil's growing closeness with Gunjan makes Samrat overprotective. Through this, Gunjan learns that Neil is in love with her, due to which she leaves the film and reconciles with Samrat. Meanwhile, Mayank and Nupur enrol for the same job scholarship, and Nupur wins it. Mayank and Nupur split after a row, and Nupur goes to Delhi. Later, Mayank and Nupur determine their differences and retake their wedding vows, and Samrat confesses his love to Gunjan. Samrat proposes to Gunjan, and she happily accepts, and later, they consummate their love. Benji also reveals his love for Dia. Mayank and Nupur decide to go to the United States, leaving nothing behind. As Nupur, Gunjan, Mayank and Samrat speed to the airport, the brakes suddenly fail, due to which Samrat careens the car off the road, and the principal characters are involved in a life-changing accident.

3-years Leap

The story then takes a three-year leap where the group believes that Nupur died because of Samrat's reckless driving. Now a trustee of Excel College, Samrat has been living a lonely life as punishment, continually recalling Gunjan and death in between drinks. Mayank works in a private company and lives with the illusion of still having Nupur around in her void. Gunjan, now a grievance counsellor, is emotionally shattered. She doesn't speak with Samrat anymore as she too blames him for her sister's death.

Ashwini or Ash is an orphan closely counselled by Gunjan. He collides with Samrat, and out of empathy, helps him past his guilt. Mayank accepts a post for a professor at Excel at Mrs Shergill's insistence. At a point, both Mayank and Ash takes Samrat's advice to move forward. Rohan or Ro, another student, clashes and falls in love with Ash. Ash and Rohan both look up to Samrat.

Mayank carries out all rituals on Nupur's death anniversary, while Gunjan doesn't offer prayers. When Mayank meets Gunjan, she addresses him by name, not as brother-in-law, which she used to call him before. Mayank realizes that she is avoiding any talk about Nupur to hide her grief. Mayank suggests Gunjan become a counsellor at Excel. She eventually accepts, curious to know about Ash's mystery man, who is actually Samrat. Mayank sees Samrat in a vulnerable state without his friends. Mayank even saves Samrat from falling off the cliff when he was hallucinating about Gunjan being present there. Later, Mayank forgives Samrat as he realizes he was also responsible for the accident. Samrat, now a colleague to Gunjan, continually attempts to woo her and make her smile again.

After a few days, Dia makes a return. She is a big fashion designer now and keeps travelling around the world. When she returns, the first person she meets is Mayank. Mayank is delighted to see her. When she addresses him as brother-in-law, he gets delighted. She tells him that while she was in China, she met her spiritual side and dreams about Nupur calling her. Mayank tells her that she imagines it because she was her sister and was very close to her. However, Dia is not convinced and asks Mayank about the accident and Nupur's death because she was not in the city when the incident happened. Initially reluctant, Mayank gives in to Dia's insistence and tells her that they themselves received her body. He further says that her face got damaged and was unrecognisable because she suffered a lot of burns. Dia is shocked to hear this and tells him that it's impossible because she knows there was no fire involved in the accident. In fact, Gunjan got severely injured, and Dia was there to take care of her in the hospital. Nupur was in another hospital. Mayank checks Nupur's death certificate, where he finds that the cause of death is burning, which, according to Dia, was not possible. He curses himself for missing out on this detail for so many years. DIA and Mayank visit the doctor who treated Nupur 3 years back, and the doctor tells them that he was treating 2 patients named Nupur on the same day. After investigation, the doctor informs them that they handed over the wrong body to them, and Nupur Bhushan is alive. He further tells Mayank and Dia that Nupur Bhushan has been living in a mental hospital for the last 3 years. The next day, when they visit the mental hospital, they are informed that Nupur was discharged 3 days back and are given an address. Dia and Mayank visit that address and get disheartened to know that Nupur emptied the house yesterday only. Mayank, however, doesn't give up and breaks into the house through a window along with Dia. Dia is shocked to see this side of Mayank. On searching the house, they find a number, and when they call on it, they hear Nupur's voice. Dia leaves the city for work while Mayank informs Gunjan and Samrat about his findings. Gunjan doesn't believe Mayank and shuns herself from comfort and hope. Samrat, on the other hand, decides to help Mayank find Nupur. While on a trail with Samrat and Gunjan, an emotionally incapacitated Mayank drives away alone and crashes into a tree. By fate, Nupur finds Mayank and takes him to the hospital. Eventually, the three find her, but Nupur consistently and rudely refuses to recognize them. They convince her to stay with them for seven days, during which each of them realizes that Nupur is hiding something. During these seven days, it was found out that a guy named Dhruv was the man behind the accident 3 years ago. Dhruv is obsessed with Nupur since childhood, due to which he also was sent for rehabilitation. Due to his release from rehab Sharma sisters have to leave Morena. After the accident Dhruv blackmailed Nupur to be with him otherwise he will hurt her beloveds. Finding the truth, Mayank, Samrat, Gunjan Ash and Rohan plots to manke Dhruv confess his crime and record it. this makes nupur free of Dhruv's claws and reconcile with Mayank.

Cast

Main
Arjun Bijlani as Mayank Sharma, cool dude and topper of college, Nupur's husband, Samrat and Gunjan's bestfriend
Rati Pandey as Nupur Sharma (née Bhushan), Gunjan's sister, Mayank's wife, Dia and Uday's cousin and Samrat's best friend
Mohit Sehgal as Samrat Shergill, the heartthrob of Excel College, basketball team captain and champion, Gunjan's husband, Mayank, Nupur, Dia and Benji's best friend 
Sanaya Irani as Gunjan Shergill (née Bhushan), Nupur's  sister, Samrat's wife, Dia and Uday's cousin and Mayank's best friend

Recurring
Navina Bole as Dia Bhushan, college diva, Uday's sister, Nupur and Gunjan's cousin, Benji's love interest
Jaskaran Gandhi as Uday Bhushan, Dia's brother, Nupur and Gunjan's cousin.Samrat & mayank brother in law.
Abhishek Sharma as Benjamin Swami (Dia's love interest), Samrat's best friend
Nishant Singh Malkani as Adhiraj, Suhaani love interest 
Anupriya Kapoor as Suhaani Shergill (Samrat's sister & Adhiraj's love interest)
Shraddha Musale as CJ
Kishwer Merchant as Tamanna Mam (Drama Teacher)
Rohit Khurana as Dhruv Verma (Nupur's obsessive lover & fake fiancé)
Khushank Arora as Ranvijay Rathore (Dia's former love interest & samrat's rival); framed Samrat in fake accident case
Preeti Keswani as Sheena Malhotra (Samrat's former love interest)
Sumeet Soni as Purab Verma (Samrat's friend)
Vaishnavi Mahant as Shilpa Sharma (Mayank's mother and Nupur's mother in law)
Jaanvi Sangwan as Ratna Bhushan(bui) (Nupur, Gunjan, Dia and Uday's aunt)
 Shishir Sharma / Anang Desai as Shashi Bhushan (Nupur & Gunjan's father)
Gireesh Sahdev as Ravi Bhushan (Dia & Uday's father)
Akruti Singh as Chinky (Nupur, Gunjan, Dia and Uday's cousin)
Sreejita De as Ashwini/Ash (Rohan's love interest)
Nikhil Chaddha as Rohan Singhal (Ash's love interest)
Meer Ali as Nirbhay Awasthi 
Kriti Sharma as Ria Singhal (Rohan's sister)
Mahru Sheikh as Indrani Shergill (Samrat & Suhani's mother)
Deepak Pareek as Professor Shukla
Jaineeraj Rajpurohit as Mr. Saxena (Principal of Excel College)
Amit Jain as Neileswar "Neil" Oberoi (Gunjan's childhood friend)
Melissa Pais as Aha Chand 
Abhinav Kapoor as Yash Devraj
Imran Khan as JD 
Latesh Sharma as Luv
Manasvi Vyas as Aparajita Mehta 
Tanvi Thakkar as Ishika 
Neelam Bhagchandani as Vidushi
Perneet Chauhan as Riya Saxena 
Sudhir Sharma as Lucky/Chunky Mishra
Gautam Hegde as Chironji Jajotia
Sachin Nayak as Chinu 
Bakhtiyaar Irani as D4 
Tannaz Irani as Tanya 
 Dinesh Mehta as Guru

Guest appearance
Karan Singh Grover as Dr.Armaan Malik
Shilpa Anand as Dr.Shilpa Malhotra 
Karan Wahi as Dr.Siddhant Modi 
Drashti Dhami as Geet
Sidharth Shukla as Veer

References

External links
 Miley Jab Hum Tum on Hotstar

Indian drama television series
Star One (Indian TV channel) original programming
2008 Indian television series debuts
2010 Indian television series endings
Indian teen drama television series